The Avalon Mall is a Canadian shopping mall located in St. John's, Newfoundland and Labrador on Kenmount Road. The mall opened in 1967 and is owned by Crombie REIT.

History
The Avalon Mall underwent major extensions in 1977, 1987 and 1999. In the late-1980s and early-1990s, low retail performance promoted mall management to embark on major renovation programs. The Scotiabank branch was renovated. Department store Ayre and Sons became The Gap in 1991, but then renovated in early 2018 once more to become Charm Diamond Centres, Claire's, The Source, and Jump Plus. In 2005, the food court, washrooms, entrances and exterior of the mall underwent major renovations.

Some of the tenants of anchor locations include Winners/HomeSense (formerly Sobeys) and, until January 9, 2018, Sears. Sears was originally Woolco until 1994, then Walmart, which closed on January 25, 2005. In fall 2005, Sears opened in the Mall, this store went through liquidation and closed on January 9, 2018. Sobeys became Winners/HomeSense in spring 2006 with both Sobeys and Walmart moving to Kelsey Drive. Both Sears and Winners operated nearby at the Village Shopping Centre. A brand new Winners/HomeSense was opened in the former Sears store in 2019.

In 1999, Empire Theatres closed its five-screen cinema (with access to the first and second floors; with most outlets on the first floor) then a Studio 12 (12 screen) theatre opened on the other end of the second floor (close to the mall's food court, the largest in Atlantic Canada). On June 27, 2013, Empire Theatres announced that it would be selling this theatre along with 23 others in Atlantic Canada to Cineplex Entertainment. Empire Theatres closed on October 22, 2013 and reopened as Cineplex Cinemas on October 25, 2013, then switched to the brand Scotiabank Theatre in November 2014. On February 28, 2018 it was announced that Cineplex would open The Rec Room in the mall in early 2019, which is adjacent to the Scotiabank Theatre. On April 18, 2019, it was officially opened and became the first location to open in Atlantic Canada.

Until provincial legalization of Sunday shopping in 1998, flea markets were common at the mall. This practice ended in December 2010, via mall management decision.

See also
 List of largest enclosed shopping malls in Canada
 List of shopping malls in Canada

References

External links and sources

 Avalon Mall

Shopping malls in Newfoundland and Labrador
Shopping malls established in 1967
Buildings and structures in St. John's, Newfoundland and Labrador
1967 establishments in Newfoundland and Labrador